Grupo Aeroportuario del Sureste, S.A.B. de C.V., known as ASUR, is a Mexican airport operator headquartered in Mexico City, Mexico. It operates 9 airports in the southeastern states of Mexico, including that of Cancún. It is the third largest airport services company by passenger traffic in Mexico. It serves approximately 23 million passengers annually.

ASUR is listed  on the Mexican Stock Exchange and in the NYSE. It is a constituent of the IPC, the main benchmark index of the Mexican Stock Exchange.

History 

ASUR was created in 1996 as the Mexican government started the privatisation of the country airport network. In 2000, ASUR launched its IPO on the NYSE (through ADRs) and the Mexican Stock Exchange, making 74.9% of the capital public. In 2004, Fernando Chico Pardo becomes the main shareholder of the company. In 2005, the government privatized its remaining 11.1% shares it owned in ASUR, making the company 100% privately held.

In 2008, ASUR reached 17.8 million yearly passengers. In 2012, 19.3 million passengers travelled through ASUR's airports. In 2013, 21 million passengers were recorded in ASUR's airports.

In November 2011, ASUR agreed to sell 49% of its shares of Inversiones y Tecnicas Aeroportuarias (ITA) to the transport company ADO.

In July 2012, in a 50/50 joint-venture with Highstar Capital, ASUR won the bid to operate the Luis Muñoz Marín International Airport (San Juan, Puerto Rico) for a 40-year term.

In December 2015, ASUR signed a deal with SunPower to purchase 36 megawatts of solar energy to power its network of airports and comply with its objective to reduce carbon emissions.

In March 2016, amid a financial crisis of domestic competitor OMA (Grupo Aeroportuario Centro Norte), ASUR considered acquiring the airport operator.

Operating Airports

Airports in Mexico

Airports outside Mexico

Passenger's number

Airports in Mexico
Number of passengers at each airport by 2021:

Airports outside Mexico
Number of passengers at each airport by 2021:

See also 

List of the busiest airports in Mexico

References

External links 
Official Website 

Mexican companies established in 1998
Airport operators of Mexico
Airports in Mexico
Aviation in Mexico
Companies listed on the Mexican Stock Exchange
Companies listed on the New York Stock Exchange
Companies based in Mexico City